Carlos Augusto Junior Florenciañez Vera, abbreviated to Carlos Florenciañez (born 9 May 1994), is a Paraguayan football midfielder playing for Ponte Preta.

Club career
Born in Ciudad del Este, Carlos Florenciañez started playing in 2010 with Club Nacional from capital Asunción. That sae year he joined Sportivo Luqueño and made his senior debut at the 2010 Paraguayan Primera División season. The following two seasons, 2011 and 2012 he played with Sportivo Luqueño in the Primera División.

In the season 2012–13 he joined Argentinian club Lanús but played only for their B team. He then returned to Paraguay and was Club Nacional player until 2014. In 2015, he played in the 2015 Paraguayan Primera División season, the first half season with Club Rubio Ñu, and second with Club Sol de América.

In January 2016 he was back with Club Rubio Ñu and played till December that year. In January 2017 he went on trials to Europe, to Serbia, to SuperLiga club FK Napredak Kruševac.

International career
Florenciañez played with Paraguay team at the 2011 South American Under-17 Football Championship having played in 6 games and scored 2 goals.

References

1994 births
Living people
Sportspeople from Ciudad del Este
Paraguayan footballers
Association football midfielders
Club Nacional footballers
Sportivo Luqueño players
Club Rubio Ñu footballers
Club Sol de América footballers
Paraguayan Primera División players
Club Atlético Lanús footballers
Expatriate footballers in Argentina